is a Japanese manga written and illustrated by Shinichi Hiromoto. Kodansha released the two bound volumes of the manga on April 23, 2002, and August 23, 2002, respectively.

The manga is licensed for an English-language release in North America by Tokyopop. Tokyopop released the two bound volumes of the manga on September 7, 2004, and December 7, 2004, respectively.

Reception
Manga Life's Kelvin Green commends the manga for its artwork but criticises the editor for the needless explaining of an homage of Star Wars.

References

External links

Seinen manga
Adventure anime and manga
Science fiction anime and manga
2002 manga
Kodansha manga
Tokyopop titles